King George may refer to:

People

Monarchs
Bohemia
George of Bohemia (1420-1471, r. 1458-1471), king of Bohemia

Duala people of Cameroon
George (Duala king) (late 18th century), king of the Duala people

Georgia
George I of Georgia (998 or 1002 - 1027, r. 1014-1027)
George I of Imereti (d. 1392, r. 1389-1392) is
George II of Georgia (c. 1054  - 1112, r. 1072-1089)
George II of Imereti (d. 1585, r. 1565-1585)
George II of Kakheti (1464-1513, r. 1511-1513)
George III of Georgia (d. 1184, r. 1156-1184)
George III of Imereti (d. 1639, r. 1605-1639)
George IV of Georgia (1191-1223, r. 1213-1223)
George V of Georgia (1286/1289-1346, r. 1299-1302 and 1314-1346)
George VI of Georgia (d. 1313, r. 1311-1313)
George VII of Georgia (d. 1405 or 1407, r. 1393-1407 or 1395-1405)
George VII of Imereti (d. 1720, r. 1707-1711, 1712-1713, 1713-1716, 1719-1720)
George VIII of Georgia (1417-1476, r. Georgia 1446-1465, r. Kakheti 1465-1476)
George IX of Imereti (1718-1778, r. 1741)
George IX of Kartli (d. 1539, r. 1525-1527 or 1534)
George X of Kartli (c. 1561 - 1606, r. 1599-1606)
George XI of Kartli (1651-1709, r. 1676-1688 and 1703-1709)
George XII of Georgia (1746-1800, r. 1798-1800)

Greece
George I of Greece (1845–1913), King of the Hellenes 1863–1913
George II of Greece (1890–1947), King of the Hellenes 1922–1924, 1935–1947

Hanover
George III of the United Kingdom (1738–1820), also George III of Hanover, 1814–1820
George IV of the United Kingdom (1762–1830), also George IV of Hanover, 1820–1830
George V of Hanover (1819–78), last king of Hanover 1851–1866

Makuria
Georgios I of Makuria (c. AD 860-920)
Georgios II of Makuria (r. 887-915/920)

Saxony
George of Saxony (1832-1904, r. 1902-1904), king of Saxony

Tonga
George Tupou I of Tonga (1797-1893, r. 1845-1893), king of Tonga
George Tupou II of Tonga (1874-1918, r. 1893-1918), king of Tonga
George Tupou V of Tonga (1948-2012, r. 2006-2012), king of Tonga

United Kingdom
George I of Great Britain (1660–1727), King of Great Britain and Ireland 1714–1727
George II of Great Britain (1683–1760), King of Great Britain and Ireland 1727–1760
George III of the United Kingdom (1738–1820), King of the United Kingdom 1760–1820
George IV of the United Kingdom (1762–1830), King of the United Kingdom 1820–1830
George V of the United Kingdom (1865–1936), King of the United Kingdom of Great Britain and Ireland 1910–1927, King of Great Britain and Ireland 1927–1936
 George VI of the United Kingdom (1895–1952), King of Great Britain and Northern Ireland 1936–1952, father of Queen Elizabeth II
 A possible future regnal name for Prince George of Wales, using his own name, would be King George VII

People with the name
 "King George", a nickname for basketball player Paul George (b. 1990)
 "KingGeorge", a nickname of George Kassa, former Tom Clancy's Rainbow Six Siege professional player turned streamer
George Strait (b. 1952), American country singer (popularly known as the "King of Country")

Fictional characters
King George II, a fictional character from Pirates of the Caribbean: On Stranger Tides
King George, a fictional character from the U.S. TV series Once Upon a Time
King George, a fictional character in Queen of the South (TV series)

Arts, entertainment, and media
 "King George and the Ducky", an episode of the Christian children's show VeggieTales

Places
King George County, Virginia
King George, Virginia, a community in the county
King George, Saskatoon, a neighbourhood in Saskatoon, Saskatchewan, Canada
Rural Municipality of King George No. 256, a rural municipality in Saskatchewan
King George Boulevard, in Surrey, British Columbia
King George Station of the Vancouver SkyTrain
King George Island (disambiguation)
King George, Honiara, a suburb in Honiara, Solomon Islands

Sports
Two British horse races, both commonly known simply as "the King George":
King George VI Chase at Kempton Park (National Hunt)
King George VI and Queen Elizabeth Stakes at Ascot (Flat)

Transportation
 , operated by the Hudson's Bay Company (HBC) from 1750–1755, see Hudson's Bay Company vessels
 , operated by the HBC from 1761–1780, see Hudson's Bay Company vessels
 , operated by the HBC from 1781–1812, see Hudson's Bay Company vessels

See also
 King (disambiguation)
 George (disambiguation)
 George I (disambiguation)
 George II (disambiguation)
 George III (disambiguation)
 George IV (disambiguation)
 George V (disambiguation)
 George VI (disambiguation)
 George VII (disambiguation)
 George VIII (disambiguation)
 George IX (disambiguation)

 George Bridge (disambiguation)
 George Street (disambiguation)